Narelle Mary Hill (born 1969) is a member of the Hill family who competed in Judo at the 1996 Summer Olympics – Women's 56 kg for Australia. She had previously won a bronze medal in judo for Australia at the 1990 Commonwealth Games.

See also

Hill family
List of Commonwealth Games medallists in judo

References

1969 births
Living people
Sportspeople from Canberra
Sportswomen from the Australian Capital Territory
Australian female judoka
Judoka at the 1990 Commonwealth Games
Commonwealth Games bronze medallists for Australia
Judoka at the 1996 Summer Olympics
Olympic judoka of Australia
Commonwealth Games medallists in judo
Narelle
20th-century Australian women
21st-century Australian women
Medallists at the 1990 Commonwealth Games